The 51° Targa Florio took place on 14 May 1967, on the Circuito Piccolo delle Madonie, Sicily (Italy).

Race

For the race, Scuderia Ferrari was unexpectedly deprived of Lorenzo Bandini, who died just four days earlier following a dramatic accident during the 1967 Monaco Grand Prix. Despite the loss, the race promised to be very competitive. Ferrari entrusted its 330 P4 to the duo Vaccarella/Scarfiotti and also deployed a smaller Dino 206 S. Porsche responded with its stable of 6 and 8-cylinders 910. Alfa Romeo deployed the relatively new 2.0 V8 Tipo 33. Ford and Lola supplied their GT40 and T70 respectively to privateers. A notable entrant was the Chaparral 2F of Hill/Sharp with its eye-catching high wing.

The 330 P4 started well, and soon took the lead. On the other hand, the heavy and bulky Chaparral soon proved to be unsuitable for tracks as twisty as Targa Florio, being easily overtaken by the nimbler 330 P4 and finally retiring due to a tire puncture. However, the lead of the 330 P4 was short-lived: while driving through Collesano during the second lap, Vaccarella made a driving error and smashed the two right wheels against a sidewalk. With the favorites out of the race, the lead was taken by the Scuderia Filipinetti Ferrari 412 P of Müller/Guichet which in turn retired soon after. With the best Ferraris out and the Tipo 33s never being a match for Porsche, the factory-backed 910s took a 1-2-3 finish thanks to their smooth and continuous pace.

Official results

References

Targa Florio
Targa Florio